Al Kharaitiyat is a town in the municipality of Umm Salal in Qatar.

Etymology
"Kharaitiyat" is the plural form of the Arabic term "khurat", which roughly translates to "map-like". The town received its name from a nearby rawda (depression) that was named for its uneven terrain and winding patterns, presenting a map-like appearance in a sense.

Administration
When free elections of the Central Municipal Council first took place in Qatar during 1999, Al Kharaitiyat was designated as seat of constituency no. 23. It would remain seat of constituency no. 23 in the next three consecutive elections until the fifth municipal elections in 2015, when it was split between constituencies no. 15 and no. 17, with the former accommodating its southern section and the latter being seated by its northern section. Aside from featuring northern Al Kharaitiyat as its seat, constituency no. 17 also includes the districts of Al Froosh and northern Izghawa.

In the inaugural municipal elections of 1999, Abdullah Abdulrahman Al Mannai was declared the winner, receiving 26.7%, or 157 votes. Runner-up was Mubarak Mohammed Al-Hajri, receiving 23.2%, or 137 votes. Overall, voter turnout was 69.3%. The 2002 elections saw Fawaz Eid Daghash elected as constituency representative. For the third municipal elections in 2007, Ali Nasser Al-Kaabi was elected as representative. Al-Kaabi lost his seat to Hamad Hadi Al Marri in the 2011 elections. In the 2015 elections, in which Al Kharaitiyat was split between two constituencies, Ali Nasser Al-Kaabi was declared the representative of constituency no. 17, which had northern Al Kharaitiyat serving as its seat.

Landmarks

Al Kharaitiyat SC on Al Ebb Road.
Al Kharaitiyat Family Park.
Qatar Charity branch on Nasser Al Attiyah Street.
Al Kharaitiyat Zakat Fund on Shu'ail bin Abdullah Al Attiyah Street.
Q-Post branch on Shu'ail bin Abdullah Al Attiyah Street.

Transport
Currently, the elevated Al Kharaitiyat Metro Station is under construction, having been launched during Phase 2A. Once completed, it will be part of Doha Metro's Green Line.

Development
Starting in 2015, Ashghal has been carrying out a major infrastructure project in the town. In line with the project, Al Kharaitiyat is being jointly developed with Al Froosh over an area of 1.87 million square meters. Developments will include 420 housing units and an addition of 22.7 km of road and 17.4 km of sewage. The project had an estimated completion date of 2019.

Sports
Al Kharaitiyat is represented by the multi sportsclub Al Kharaitiyat SC.

Education
The following schools are located in Al Kharaitiyat:

References 

Populated places in Umm Salal